Solh Kabul F.C. is a football team in Afghanistan. They play in the Afghan Premier League.

Managers

Current squad

Achievements

External links
 http://www.solh.com

References

Football clubs in Afghanistan
Sport in Kabul